Melendez is the American spelling of a Spanish-Asturleonese surname common in the United States Puerto Rican community. Philippines was once a Spanish Commonwealth and later a US Commonwealth. Thus, Melendez is also the surname of Filipinos and Filipino-Americans.  The Spanish surname is Meléndez. It may refer to:

 Andre Melendez, nicknamed "Angel", a Club Kid and purported drug dealer murdered by Michael Alig and Robert D. "Freeze" Riggs
 Benjamin Melendez, American gang member
 Bill Melendez, Mexican-born American animator
 Fausto Melendez, Filipino-American Chicago, IL postal worker who came up with the idea of the US postal ZIP Code.
 Gilbert Melendez, American MMA fighter
 Jack Melendez, Puerto Rican sportscaster
 John Melendez, American writer and radio personality
 Juan Melendez, American prison rights activist
 Lisette Melendez, American pop singer
 Mervyl Melendez, American college baseball coach
 MJ Melendez, American baseball player

See also
 Meléndez
 Flor Meléndez, Puerto Rican coach